Jumaa Jenaro Awad (born 28 February 1988) is a South Sudanese international footballer who plays as a goalkeeper.

When South Sudan gained independence from Sudan, his club, Hay Al Wadi SC, had difficulty extending Genaro's contract as he was now considered a foreign player. As a result, he signed a contract with Al-Kober, and was seconded to Al-Hilal.

He made his debut versus Uganda on 10 July 2012.

Honours

Clubs
Al-Hilal Club
Sudan Premier League
Champion: (5) 2010, 2012, 2014, 2016, 2017
Sudan Cup
'''Winner's:  (2) 2011, 2016

References

External links

1988 births
Living people
People from Omdurman
Sudanese people of South Sudanese descent
People with acquired South Sudanese citizenship
Sudanese footballers
South Sudanese footballers
Association football goalkeepers
South Sudan international footballers
Al-Hilal Club (Omdurman) players
al-Ahly Shendi players